Lis (Polish for "Fox") is a Polish coat of arms. It was used by many noble families of Clan Lis.

The legend of the coat of arms

In 1058 Duke Casimir I the Restorer while chasing the pagan Lithuanians and Yotvingians who devastated Polish lands, came to Sochaczew. He sent a knight of the Lis Clan (Fox Clan) to scout the region for enemies. When the knight came across a river he met a strong enemy unit. Unable to attack them alone, he decided immediately to shoot a lighted arrow into the air to call for reinforcements. Help arrived soon and defeated the enemies. A grateful Casimir granted the brave knight a new coat of arms with an arrow in the escutcheon and his former sign - the fox - was placed in the crest.

Notable bearers

Notable bearers of this coat of arms have included:
Krystyn z Kozichgłów 
Jaksa z Targowiska
Mikołaj z Kozłowa
Ferdynand Antoni Ossendowski
Stanisław Chomętowski
Sapieha Family
Adam Stefan Sapieha
Aleksander Michał Sapieha
Aleksander Paweł Sapieha
Jan Sapieha
Kazimierz Sapieha
Kazimierz Jan Paweł Sapieha
Lew Sapieha
Paweł Jan Sapieha
Kazimierz Nestor Sapieha
 Szymon Rudnicki, Bishop of Warmia
 Melchior Wańkowicz
 Henryk Samsonowicz
 Ferdynand Ruszczyc

Gallery

External links 
  Lis Coat of Arms (including altered) and their bearers

See also
 Polish heraldry
 Heraldic family
 List of Polish nobility coats of arms

Bibliography
 Andrzej Kulikowski: Wielki herbarz rodów polskich. Warszawa: Świat Książki, 2005, s. 238-240. .
 Jan Długosz: Jana Długosza kanonika krakowskiego Dziejów polskich ksiąg dwanaście, ks. IX. Kraków: 1867-1870, s. 264.
 Tadeusz Gajl: Herbarz polski od średniowiecza do XX wieku : ponad 4500 herbów szlacheckich 37 tysięcy nazwisk 55 tysięcy rodów. L&L, 2007. .

Polish coats of arms